The women's heptathlon event at the 2000 World Junior Championships in Athletics was held in Santiago, Chile, at Estadio Nacional Julio Martínez Prádanos on 20 and 21 October.

Medalists

Results

Final
20/21 October

Participation
According to an unofficial count, 20 athletes from 17 countries participated in the event.

References

Heptathlon
Combined events at the World Athletics U20 Championships